Tarong North Power Station is a 443 megawatt coal fired power station on the same site as Tarong Power Station in the South Burnett. The Queensland Government commissioned the construction of the power station in November 1999.  Construction work began in 2000.  The power station was initially owned by a 50/50 joint venture between Tarong Energy and TM Energy. Full ownership of the power station by Tarong Energy was obtained in November 2009.

The plant was opened in 2003 and is based on an energy efficient supercritical design.  The Steam Generator was supplied by IHI and the steam turbine was manufactured by Toshiba.
Particulate emissions at the power station are reduced by bag filter technology.

See also

List of active power stations in Queensland

References

Coal-fired power stations in Queensland
Wide Bay–Burnett
Power stations in Queensland